The Fédération française de la couture, du prêt-à-porter des couturiers et des créateurs de mode is the governing body for the French fashion industry.  The Federation was created in 1973, growing out of an older trade association (which still exists within the Federation), the Chambre syndicale de la haute couture parisienne which was created in 1868. By the 1st of July 2017, the Federation removed its reference to French nationality for a more succinct title.

About 
The Federation comprises three separate  trade associations:

 Chambre Syndicale de la Haute Couture (English: trade association of high fashion)
 Chambre Syndicale de la Mode Masculine
Chambre Syndicale du Prêt-à-Porter des Couturiers et des Créateurs de Mode

The Federation also has a fashion school, the École de la chambre syndicale de la couture parisienne (created in 1927 and still active). Alumni of the school include Valentino Garavani, Yves Saint Laurent, Karl Lagerfeld, André Courreges, Issey Miyake, Anne Valerie Hash, Alexis Mabille, Tomas Maier, Nicole Miller, Stephane Rolland, Victor Joris.

The Federation has close ties to the Union Nationale Artisanale de la Couture et des Activités Connexes, a trade association of couture dressmakers in other French administrative regions outside of Paris.

The Federation is responsible for setting the dates and location of the French fashion weeks.  It also establishes industry standards on quality and on the use of the word "haute couture".

Prêt-à-Porter Member Fashion Houses and Designers
 See list of grands couturiers for haute couture houses.

See also 
 French fashion
 Haute couture
 List of fashion designers
 List of grands couturiers
 Arab Fashion Council
 Association Nationale pour le Développement des Arts de la Mode
 British Fashion Council
 Council of Fashion Designers of America
 National Chamber of Italian Fashion

References
 This article is based on the webpage of the Federation (see external links).

External links 

Fashion organizations
French fashion
.
.
.
Trade associations based in France
Organizations based in Paris
Arts organizations established in 1973
1973 establishments in France